Granville Township is one of the 25 townships of Licking County, Ohio, United States. As of the 2010 census the population was 9,773, up from 8,994 in 2000. 4,143 of the population in 2010 lived in the unincorporated portions of the township.

Geography
Located in the center of the county, it borders the following townships and city:
McKean Township - north
Newton Township - northeast
Newark Township - east
Newark - southeast
Union Township - south
Harrison Township - southwest corner
St. Albans Township - west
Liberty Township - northwest corner

Several populated places are located in Granville Township:
The village of Granville, in the east and center
The census-designated place of Granville South, in the southwest

Name and history
Granville Township is named after Granville, Massachusetts. Statewide, the only other Granville Township is located in Mercer County.

Government
The township is governed by a three-member board of trustees, who are elected in November of odd-numbered years to a four-year term beginning on the following January 1. Two are elected in the year after the presidential election and one is elected in the year before it. There is also an elected township fiscal officer, who serves a four-year term beginning on April 1 of the year after the election, which is held in November of the year before the presidential election. Vacancies in the fiscal officership or on the board of trustees are filled by the remaining trustees.

References

External links

County website

Townships in Licking County, Ohio
Townships in Ohio